Kampe may refer to:

People with the surname
 Anja Kampe (born 1968), German opera singer
 Eva Kampe (born 1940), Australian track and field athlete
 Gordon Kampe (born 1976), German composer
 Greg Kampe (born 1955), American basketball coach
 Willi Kampe (1888–1918), German flying ace of World War I

Others
 Campe, also spelled Kampê, a Greek mythological monster
 Kampe (Glowe), a village in the German municipality of Glowe
 Kampê, a character in the Percy Jackson & the Olympians series of fantasy adventure novels